John Krause (born November 11, 1983 in Framingham, Massachusetts) is a Puerto Rican international footballer who most recently played for the Carolina RailHawks in the North American Soccer League.

Career

College and amateur
Krause was born in Framingham, Massachusetts, the youngest son of M. Jan and Harold Krause's five sons. He was raised in Holliston, Massachusetts and attended The Rivers School, before playing college soccer for both Boston College and Vanderbilt University, and for Worcester Kings in the USL Premier Development League.

Professional
Undrafted out of college, Krause turned professional in 2006, playing with the Cincinnati Kings in the USL Second Division, finishing as the team's top scorer.

Krause joined the Puerto Rico Islanders in the USL First Division in 2007. He helped the Islanders win the 2008 USL First Division regular season title and progressed to the semi finals of the CONCACAF Champions League 2008–09.

In 2008 Krause also spent a short period playing indoor soccer with the Massachusetts Twisters in the National Indoor Soccer League. He also spent time with Monterrey La Raza.

He joined the Hanoi team Hòa Phát Hà Nội for the 2010 season, starting January 31, 2010.

Krause transferred to Beijing Baxy&Shengshi on July 16, 2010.

He signed with Carolina RailHawks of the North American Soccer League on March 7, 2011.

International
Krause was called up to the Puerto Rico national team in September 2010. As a United States citizen he was eligible to the team after residing in the Commonwealth for two years while playing with the Puerto Rico Islanders. He got his first cap in a 2010 Caribbean Championship qualification stage match against Anguilla on October 2, 2010 and scored his first goal in the same competition against Saint-Martin two days later.

Honors

Club

Puerto Rico Islanders
 USL First Division Championship runners-up: 2008
 Commissioner's Cup: 2008
 CFU Club Championship runner-up: 2009

References

External links
 Puerto Rico Islanders bio
 

1983 births
Living people
American soccer players
Puerto Rican footballers
Puerto Rico international footballers
Boston College Eagles men's soccer players
Vanderbilt Commodores men's soccer players
Worcester Kings players
Cape Cod Crusaders players
Wilmington Hammerheads FC players
Cincinnati Kings players
Puerto Rico Islanders players
North Carolina FC players
USL First Division players
USL Second Division players
USL League Two players
North American Soccer League players
Expatriate footballers in Vietnam
American expatriate sportspeople in Vietnam
Expatriate footballers in China
American expatriate sportspeople in China
Beijing Sport University F.C. players
China League One players
Monterrey La Raza players
Major Indoor Soccer League (2008–2014) players
Soccer players from Massachusetts
Association football defenders
American expatriate soccer players
Expatriate footballers in Mexico
American expatriate sportspeople in Mexico
People from Holliston, Massachusetts
Sportspeople from Framingham, Massachusetts
New Jersey Ironmen (MISL) players
Hòa Phát Hà Nội FC players
San Diego Sockers players
Sportspeople from Middlesex County, Massachusetts